George Clark Robertson (7 March 1885 – 10 May 1937) was a Scottish footballer who played for Yoker Athletic, Motherwell, The Wednesday and East Fife. Robertson also represented Scotland four times, between 1910 and 1913.

References

1885 births
1937 deaths
Sportspeople from Clackmannanshire
Scottish footballers
Association football outside forwards
Yoker Athletic F.C. players
Motherwell F.C. players
Sheffield Wednesday F.C. players
East Fife F.C. players
Scottish Football League players
English Football League players
Scottish Junior Football Association players
Scotland international footballers
Scottish emigrants to the United States